Silvia Manríquez (born January 27, 1953, in Mexico City,  Mexico) is a Mexican actress. She is known for her roles in telenovelas.

Professional life 
Manriquez began her career in 1974, after she was named "El Rostro del Heraldo" by an important Mexican newspaper. Her first role in television was in the telenovela Lo Imperdonable (1975) with the Spanish actress Amparo Rivelles. She played characters in the movie La Casta Divina (1976) and in telenovelas as Un rostro en mi pasado (1991), Pueblo chico, infierno grande (1997) with Verónica Castro, Laberintos de Pasion (1999), Entre el amor y el odio (2002), Mundo de Fieras (2006), Dos hogares (2011) and recently Amores verdaderos (2012–2013).

Personal life 
Manríquez was born in Mexico. Her childhood wish was to become an actress. Her mother was the only family member that approved of her career aspirations. Silvia is divorced and she has two children named Xareni and Lliv.

Manríquez had many roles in telenovelas. She played Jovita Ruán in the telenovela Pueblo chico, infierno grande, with Verónica Castro. She played Rosalía, mother of evil Frida (Sabine Moussier) in Entre el amor y el odio. She also played Amparo in Contra viento y marea.

Filmography

Telenovelas

Films (selected) 
 1974: El Buscabullas
 1975: Chisme Caliente
 1975: Lo Veo y no lo Creo
 1976: Fox Trot
 1976: La Casta Divina
 1977: Misterio en las Bermudas
 1977: Muerte a Sangre Fría
 1977: Río de la Muerte
 1978: Hermanos Chicanos
 1978: Mexicano Hasta las Cachas
 1978: Dinastía Dracula
 1979: Todos Los Días un Día
 1979: Ojo por Ojo
 1979: Aqui esta Emili Varela
 1979: El Giro el Pinto y el Colorado
 1979: El Siete Vidas
 1979: Las Tres Sobrinas del Diablo
 1980: El Canto de Los Humildes
 1980: La Sangre de Nuestra Raza
 1980: La Carrera de los Sexos
 1981: Un Reverendo Trinquete
 1981: El Naco más Naco
 1981: Las Musiqueras
 1982: El Guerillero del Norte
 1982: En Las Garras de la Ciudad
 1982: Sorceress
 1982: Un Adorable Sinverguenza
 1982: El Pueblo que Olvidó
 1983: Esta y al otra por el mismo Boleto
 1983: Los Hijos de Peralvillo
 1984: Entre Hierrba Polvo y Plomo
 1984: Bohemio por Afición
 1984: Jugandose la Vida
 1985: La Muerte Llora de Risa
 1985: Forajidos en la Mira
 1987: Mente Asesina
 1987: Conexión México
 1987: Los Ojos del Muerto
 1987: Persecución en las Vegas
 1988: El Unico Testigo
 1989: Entre Juego y Contrabando
 1989: Carroña Humana
 1989: Catalepsia
 1990: Las Viejas de mi Compadre
 1990: Funerales del Terror
 1991: La Guerrera Vengadora
 1991: El Enviado de la Muerte
 1992: El Secuestro de un Periodista
 1992: El Grito de la Sangre
 1992: Alto Poder
 1993: La Venganza
 1994: Que Padre tan Padre
 2000: Amor Siego
 2001: El Día de los Albañiles 4
 2015: ‘’El Hotel

See also 
List of characters in Entre el amor y el odio

References

External links

1955 births
Living people
Mexican telenovela actresses
Mexican television actresses
Mexican film actresses
20th-century Mexican actresses
21st-century Mexican actresses
Actresses from Mexico City
People from Mexico City